The 2023 Copa de la División Profesional, known as the 2023 Copa Tigo for sponsorship purposes, is the first edition of the Copa de la División Profesional, a Bolivian league cup competition which is contested by the 17 teams that take part in the Bolivian Primera División for the 2023 season. The competition was approved at a meeting of the División Profesional's Council held on 13 January 2023. It began on 14 February and is scheduled to end on 6 December 2023.

Format
The Copa de la División Profesional, which will be played on weekdays and concurrently with the 2023 División Profesional tournament, will feature a group stage and an 8-team knockout stage. For the group stage, the 17 teams were drawn into two groups of six teams and one group of five, in which teams will play each one of their group rivals twice (once at home and once away). The top three teams of the six-team groups and the top two teams in the five-team group will advance to the knockout stage. The quarter-finals and semi-finals will be played over two legs, whilst the final will be played as a single match on neutral ground.

The Copa de la División Profesional champions will be entitled to qualify for the 2024 Copa Libertadores, taking the Bolivia 4 berth for that competition, while the runners-up will qualify for the 2024 Copa Sudamericana, taking the Bolivia 1 berth.

Group stage

Group A

Group B

Group C

Knockout stage

Bracket

See also
2023 Bolivian Primera División

References

External links
 División Profesional on the FBF's official website 

C
Bolivia
Bolivia